Cheshmeh-ye Qader (also Romanized as Cheshmeh-ye Qāder) is a village in Gamasiyab Rural District, in the Central District of Sahneh County, Kermanshah Province, Iran. At the 2006 census, its population was 53, in 12 families.

References 

Populated places in Sahneh County